Maurice Letchford (August 27, 1908 – August 15, 1965) was a Canadian wrestler. He was born in Pretoria, South Africa and lived in Montreal. He was Olympic bronze medalist in Freestyle wrestling in 1928, welterweight class, after losing to Lloyd Appleton in the semifinal, and winning the 3rd place tournament. Letchford turned professional in 1932 and competed through the late 1940s. He was a well-known performer in Canada, Britain, and the United States. He later became a wrestling promoter in Canada and South Africa.

References

External links

 https://www.wrestlingdata.com/index.php?befehl=bios&wrestler=2659

1908 births
1965 deaths
Sportspeople from Pretoria
Olympic wrestlers of Canada
Wrestlers at the 1928 Summer Olympics
Canadian male sport wrestlers
Olympic bronze medalists for Canada
Olympic medalists in wrestling
Medalists at the 1928 Summer Olympics
South African emigrants to Canada
Canadian male professional wrestlers
Sportspeople from Montreal
Anglophone Quebec people
20th-century Canadian people